Česlovas Daukša (born 1916, date of death unknown) was a Lithuanian basketball player. He won gold medal with Lithuania national basketball team during EuroBasket 1937.

Biography
Daukša born in Saint Petersburg, Russian Empire. After returning to Lithuania with his parents, he graduated six classes in Kaunas Aušra gymnasium. Later he worked at "Spindulys" printing house. Despite playing football from an early age, in 1935 he became a basketball player and in the same year, he debuted in Lithuania national basketball team during painful loss to Latvia.

After Konstantinas Savickas began training Lithuania national team, Lithuania game play improved drastically. Daukša was a member of Lithuania national team during EuroBasket 1937 and won gold medal with it.

After World War II, he worked at Republican Physical Education and Sport Committee and other sports organizations. He retired in 1987 and later lived in Kaunas, Lithuania. Daukša is deceased.

References

Sources
 Vidas Mačiulis, Vytautas Gudelis. Halė, kurioje žaidė Lubinas ir Sabonis. 1939–1989 – Respublikinis sporto kombinatas, Kaunas, 1989

1916 births
Year of death missing
FIBA EuroBasket-winning players
Lithuanian men's basketball players